The 2018 European League of Legends Championship Series (2018 EU LCS) was the sixth season of the European League of Legends Championship Series, (EU LCS) the highest level of professional League of Legends play in Europe. Most games were being played at Studio K/L in Adlershof, Berlin, Germany.

Format 
Plans to break league into 4 regions and applying franchising business model was postponed until season 2019. Best-of-three format with dividing teams into two groups has been replaced by a Double Round Robin Format with "best of one" matches in a single group owing to EU LCS viewership falling.

Second-tier competition in Europe from season 2014 to 2017 was Challenger Series. In season 2018 it has been replaced by European Regional Leagues (ERLs). Promotion Tournament was cancelled, the European Cup provided in addition to ERLs.

Spring

Regular season

Playoffs

Summer

Regular season

Playoffs

References 

2018 in Berlin
2018 in German sport
Spring 2018 in League of Legends competitions
European League of Legends Championship Series seasons